
Gmina Wodzisław is a rural gmina (administrative district) in Jędrzejów County, Świętokrzyskie Voivodeship, in south-central Poland.

Villages
Gmina Wodzisław contains the villages and settlements of Brzeście, Brzezinki, Dębiany, Droblin, Folga Pierwsza, Jeziorki, Judasze, Kaziny, Klemencice, Konary, Kowalów Dolny, Kowalów Górny, Krężoły, Łany, Laskowa, Lubcza, Ludwinów, Mieronice, Mierzawa, Nawarzyce, Niegosławice, Nowa Olszówka, Olbrachcice, Pękosław, Piotrkowice, Podlesie, Pokrzywnica, Promyk, Przezwody, Przyłęczek, Przyłęk, Przyrąb, Sadki, Sielec, Stara Olszówka, Strzeszkowice, Świątniki, Wodacz, Wodzisław, Wola Lubecka, Września and Zarzecze.

Neighbouring gminas
Gmina Wodzisław is bordered by the gminas of Działoszyce, Jędrzejów, Kozłów, Książ Wielki, Michałów and Sędziszów.

References
Polish official population figures 2006

Wodzislaw
Jędrzejów County